Paratrox medvedevi is an extinct, fossil species of hide beetle that lived in modern-day Mongolia around 125 to 113 million years ago, during the Lower Cretaceous. P. medvedevi is the only species of the genus Paratrox.

References

†
Fossil taxa described in 2009
Prehistoric beetles